Guang'anmenwai Subdistrict is a subdistrict on the southwest corner of the Xicheng District, Beijing, China. As of 2020, it has a total population of 198,657.

The subdistrict got its name due to its location outside of Guang'anmen and the former Beijing city wall.

History

Administrative Division 
As of 2021, there are a total of 38 communities within the subdistrict:

References 

Xicheng District
Subdistricts of Beijing